Herman G. "Hank" Tillman Jr. (1 April 1922 – 19 February 2012) was an American United States Air Force pilot who served in three wars and was one of Maryland's most decorated veterans. He served as the wingman for Jimmy Doolittle during a raid on Rome. During the Korean War, he ferried planes to South Korea. He flew 105 combat missions in Vietnam.

Tillman led the 66th Tactical Reconnaissance Wing at RAF Upper Heyford, Oxfordshire, England.  At the time of his retirement in 1972, he was chief of staff of the 9th Air Force in Sumter, South Carolina.

References

1922 births
2012 deaths
United States Air Force personnel of the Korean War
United States Air Force personnel of the Vietnam War
American Korean War pilots
American Vietnam War pilots
Deaths from organ failure
Military personnel from Baltimore
Recipients of the Air Medal
Recipients of the Distinguished Flying Cross (United States)
Recipients of the Legion of Merit
Recipients of the Silver Star
Shot-down aviators
United States Air Force officers
United States Army Air Forces pilots of World War II